Fritillaria gussichiae is a European plant species in the lily family Liliaceae, native to Bulgaria, North Macedonia, Serbia, Albania, and Greece.

The plant was once considered part of Fritillaria graeca but more recent studies suggest it is a distinct species more closely related to Fritillaria pontica.

References

External links
North American Rock Garden Society photo
Гусихиева ведрица /Fritillaria gussichiae - ДПП Рилски манастир  photo

gussichiae
Flora of Europe
Plants described in 1897